Jerry Gretzinger (born 1942)  is an American folk artist and fashion designer. He is best known for his map of an invented landscape known simply as "Jerry's map". Gretzinger has been working on his map for over 60 years; it has grown to include over 3,000 unique panels, and is constantly evolving. 

Jerry's map has been shown at numerous international museums including the Palais de Tokyo, MASS MoCA, and the American Folk Art Museum.

Early life 
Gretzinger was born in Grand Rapids, Michigan. Gretzinger was a bright student who excelled at school which would earn him a National Merit Scholarship. Throughout childhood, Gretzinger never became involved in organized sports or other extracurricular activities and, "the truth was that I never felt like I belonged." He collected oil company maps and would pour over his maps and the family's encyclopedia. These allowed him to imagine a world beyond his horizon.

Early career 
Gretzinger attended the University of Michigan in Ann Arbor, Michigan where he enrolled in the College of Architecture & Design. While living in Ann Arbor following his sophomore year, he was working at a ball bearing factory. During breaks in his work, Gretzinger began to sketch a map on a sheet of paper and when his drawing reached the edge of the page he continued onto the next sheet. These were the first panels of what would become "Jerry's Map".

Gretzinger transferred to the University of California, Berkeley, where he continued his studies. During his first fall in San Francisco, Gretzinger applied and was accepted into the Peace Corps. In 1964, he completed training and moved to Tunisia for his service. In 1966, Gretzinger completed his studies at the University of Michigan and that year he returned to Tunisia to be an architect and project manager working on an archeological project The Corpus of the Ancient Mosaics of Tunisia.

Personal life 
Gretzinger married in 1965. Nelle, his daughter was born in 1966. Three years later, in 1969, they were joined by their son, Aaron. In 1971 Gretzinger separated from his wife.  In 1980 he married Meg Staley and in 1983 they welcomed their first son together, Hank, and in 1986 their second son, Lucky.

Career 
Gretzinger left North Africa to move to New York City in 1971 where he set himself to start a new career. He says, "I knew that I wanted to make things, make a living from what I made, and that's what I devoted myself to." He organized a textiles show of imported Tunisian and Moroccan rugs and began a small business selling pillows and bags he had been making. Partnering with the SoHo Designer's Collective, he began to design a line of experimental clothing. Together with his second wife Meg Staley, Gretzinger launched Staley/Gretzinger which expanded his clothing line with Meg's commercial and printmaking experience. Throughout the 1980s and 1990s the company grew to be a commercial success. In the years following his move to New York, Gretzinger continued working on his map and it grew in size and complexity; as the business grew and his responsibilities increased, he put the map into retirement to devote himself to the business. Gretzinger moved to Cold Spring, New York and acquired a farm in Maple City, Michigan.

Rediscovery of map to present 
In 2003, Gretzinger's son Hank discovered the map which had been archived in their Cold Spring attic and very soon Gretzinger began work on the map again in earnest. In 2009, he had his first show of the map at the Garrison Art Center in Cold Spring with an accompanying video documentary produced by independent filmmaker Greg Whitmore. The video was featured as an Editor's Choice on Vimeo and shortly after, he was invited to exhibit the entirety of the map and a reproduction of his studio at MASS MoCA. Since then, his map has been featured in numerous publications and solo and group exhibition. Gretzinger's work on the map has grown increasingly abstract incorporating new elements of erasure and collage. Looking towards the future of the map, he sees himself working on the map for as long as he can and is actively looking for museums and collectors to serve as permanent homes for the map.

Selected exhibitions 
Gretzinger's work has been included in group (G) and solo (S) exhibitions around the world.

 2019 York College of Pennsylvania Galleries (S)
 2019 Intuit, Chicago (S)
 2018 American Folk Art Museum, New York (G)
 2017 Edna Carlsten Art Gallery, UWSP | Terrain/Territories: Dreams of Place | (G)
 2016 Aichi Triennale, Nagoya, Japan | Rainbow Caravan | (G)
 2016 UICA, Grand Rapids, MI | Coming Home | (G)
 2015 Thomas Cole National Historic Site, Catskill, NY  | River Crossings | (G)
 2015 Palais de Tokyo, Paris, France | Le Borde Des Mondes | (G)
 2013/4 Summerhall, Edinburgh, Scotland, UK | Summerhall | (S)
 2013/4 Brattleboro Museum and Art Center, Brattleboro, Vermont | BMAC | (S)
 2013 ArtPrize, Women's City Club, Grand Rapids, Michigan (G)
 2012 MASSMoCA, North Adams, Massachusetts | Press Release | (S)
 2009 ArtPrize, Urban Institute for Contemporary Art, Grand Rapids, Michigan (G)
 2009 Garrison Art Center, Garrison, New York (S)
 2004 City/Space, Oakland, California (G)

References

External links
Jerry's map

Living people
1942 births
American folk art
Outsider artists
21st-century American artists
20th-century American artists
Artists from Grand Rapids, Michigan
University of Michigan alumni
University of California alumni